An amusement park is a group of entertainment attractions, rides, and other events in a location for the enjoyment of large numbers of people. 

Amusement Park may also refer to:
 Wonder Park, also known as Amusement Park
 "Amusement Park" (song)

See also
 Theme Park (disambiguation)